Tapinothelops is a genus of African nursery web spiders that was first described by Carl Friedrich Roewer in 1955.  it contains only two species, found only in Africa: T. concolor and T. vittipes.

See also
 List of Pisauridae species

References

Araneomorphae genera
Pisauridae
Spiders of Africa
Taxa named by Carl Friedrich Roewer